David Jackson Davis (October 15, 1878 – December 7, 1938) was a United States district judge of the United States District Court for the Northern District of Alabama.

Education and career

Born in Wedowee, Alabama, Davis received a Bachelor of Laws from Yale Law School in 1906. He was in private practice in Birmingham, Alabama from 1906 to 1935.

Federal judicial service

On December 10, 1935, Davis received a recess appointment from President Franklin D. Roosevelt to a seat on the United States District Court for the Northern District of Alabama vacated by Judge William Irwin Grubb. Formally nominated to the same seat by President Roosevelt on January 6, 1936, Davis was confirmed by the United States Senate on January 22, 1936, and received his commission on January 28, 1936. Davis served in that capacity until his death on December 7, 1938.

References

Sources
 

1878 births
1938 deaths
People from Randolph County, Alabama
Lawyers from Birmingham, Alabama
Judges of the United States District Court for the Northern District of Alabama
United States district court judges appointed by Franklin D. Roosevelt
20th-century American judges
Yale Law School alumni